Canada's Got Talent is a Canadian television reality talent show, which debuted on the Citytv network on March 4, 2012. It is part of the global Got Talent franchise.

As with other series in the franchise, the show is a competition in which entertainers in various fields compete to win a prize. In the first season, the winner won a prize of $100,000 and a Nissan GT-R, an opportunity to perform during Citytv's New Year's Eve bash, a possibility to perform in a venue in Las Vegas and a trip to Trinidad and Tobago. In the second season, the winner received a cash prize of $150,000.

The first season was won by the Manitoba-based dance troupe Sagkeeng's Finest. Citytv brought back Canada's Got Talent for a second season in 2022. In October 2021, Citytv announced that Lindsay Ell would host, along with Howie Mandel, Lilly Singh, Kardinal Offishall, and Trish Stratus serving as judges. The season premiered in March 2022, and ended in May. It was won by Quebec singer Jeanick Fournier. Following the second season's finale, the series was greenlit for a third season.

Format

Auditions 
The auditions took place in front of the judges, and a live audience at different cities across Canada. At any time during the audition, the judges would show their disapproval of the act by pressing a buzzer, which lights a large red "X" on the stage. If all the judges pressed their buzzers, the act must end. Voting worked on a majority-of-two basis, where two positive votes from the judges were required.

The Cutdown 
In the first season, acts that were accepted past the audition moved on to the Judges Round (also known as "The Cutdown"). This stage of the competition did not feature any audiences, and only contained contestants performing in front of the judges. Out of all the acts that made it to this point, thirty-six made it through to the next round, which was the semi-finals. In the second season, this part of the show was removed.

Semi-finals 
The semi-finals and final were broadcast with a varying number of semi-finals, followed by the one final split into two episodes over one night. The remaining acts performed across a number of semi-finals, with the two most popular acts from each semi-final winning a position in the final. Judges could still end a performance early with three X's. The judges were asked to express their views on each act's performance. Phone lines, Twitter, Facebook, texting and online voting platforms opened for a one hour after all acts performed. The public voted for the act they thought were the best. Voters could submit a total of fifty votes (ten in each platform). After the votes were counted, the act that polled the highest number of public votes, was automatically placed in the final. The judges then chose between the second and third most popular acts, with the winner of that vote also gaining a place in the final. All other acts were then eliminated from the competition.

Judges 

Canadian comedian and actor, Martin Short, was announced as the first judge on October 13, 2011. On October 17, opera singer Measha Brueggergosman and musician/composer Stephan Moccio, were announced as the two judges to join Short. Citytv Toronto personality and Breakfast Television host, Dina Pugliese, was the host of the show.

In October 2021, it was announced that Howie Mandel, Lilly Singh, Kardinal Offishall and Trish Stratus would serve as judges for the show, with Lindsay Ell as host.

Season overview

Season 1 (2012) 

The first season of Canada's Got Talent aired on Citytv across Canada (and on other TV stations across the country, where there is no Citytv station), starting on March 4, 2012.

Preliminary auditions for the first season of Canada's Got Talent took place during fall 2011, and continued into January 2012. Auditions for the show took place in Winnipeg, Calgary, Vancouver, Montreal, Toronto and Halifax.

Acts chosen to perform in front of the host, judges and a live audience were invited back, starting in Calgary on October 18 and 19. The production tour then went to each of the original cities in October, November, December 2011 and January 2012. Those chosen by the panel of judges went to Toronto for the next rounds, and completed with audience voting, in April and May 2012.

Sagkeeng's Finest received the most votes from Canada, winning the first season of Canada's Got Talent.

Hiatus 
In June 2012, Rogers Media president Scott Moore announced that a second season would not be produced, after a "careful consideration of all factors, including the current economic climate".

A Canadian Family's Got Talent competition was held on Citytv's morning show Breakfast Television in 2020, in acknowledgement of COVID-19 pandemic lockdowns across the country (and to promote season 15 of America's Got Talent). The contest was won by Toronto-based singing trio CZN.

Season 2 (2022) 

On June 8, 2021 it was announced that the series would be revived, first announced to be returning in spring 2022. Production on the series took place in fall 2021 at Niagara Falls.

On December 31, 2021, it was announced that the revival would premiere in March 2022, which was later specified as March 22.

Jeanick Fournier received the most votes from Canada, winning the second season of Canada's Got Talent.

Season 3 

Following the season two finale in May 2022, it was announced that the series was greenlit for a third season. The auditions were filmed at the OLG Stage at the Fallsview Casino in Niagara Falls, Ontario. Filming took place from October 19 to 23, 2022. The season will premiere on March 21, 2023.

Season summary

Broadcasting 
Because of the various time zones in Canada, only viewers in the provinces and territories east of Manitoba saw the show live (in the Newfoundland, Atlantic and Eastern time zones). All other areas in Canada broadcast the show on a tape delay basis. All Citytv stations aired the show at 8:00 p.m. (in each time zone where there is a Citytv station) with the Toronto station airing the program at 8:00 p.m. Viewers in Newfoundland saw the show live at 9:30 p.m. and viewers in the Atlantic region at 9:00 p.m., because there is no Citytv station in these provinces to broadcast the show at local time. The same process occurred with the results show.

Ratings

References

External links 
 
 Production website
 

2010s Canadian reality television series
2020s Canadian reality television series
2012 Canadian television series debuts
Canadian television series based on British television series
Canadian television series revived after cancellation
Citytv original programming

English-language television shows
Television series by Fremantle (company)
Television series by Insight Productions